Jack Frost is a personification of frost, ice, snow, sleet, winter, and freezing cold. He is a variant of Old Man Winter who is held responsible for frosty weather, nipping the fingers and toes in such weather, coloring the foliage in autumn, and leaving fern-like patterns on cold windows in winter.

Starting in late 19th century literature, more developed characterizations of Jack Frost depict him as a sprite-like character, sometimes appearing as a sinister mischief-maker or as a hero.

Background

Jack Frost is traditionally said to leave the frosty, fern-like patterns on windows on cold winter mornings (window frost or fern frost) and nipping the extremities in cold weather. Over time, window frost has become far less prevalent in the modern world due to the advance of double-glazing, but Jack Frost remains a well-known figure in popular culture. He is sometimes described or depicted with paint brush and bucket coloring the autumnal foliage red, yellow, brown, and orange.

History

Tales of Jack Frost may originate from Anglo-Saxon and Norse winter customs. Jack has an entire chapter named after him in Kalevala, the Finnish national epic compiled from their ancient oral tradition.

There are various other mythological beings who take on a similar role yet have a unique folklore to them. In Russia, he has taken on a different form as Grandfather Frost, and in Germany there is instead a different entity altogether known as Mrs. Holle. The Hindu Kush mountain range is named after stories of a resident giant who would kill (kesh) those who attempted to pass, and has been compared to England's Jack Frost.

The earliest reference to Jack Frost in literature is in the book 'Round About Our Coal Fire, or Christmas Entertainments' published in 1734.

Jack Frost is mentioned in many songs – such as the wintertime song "The Christmas Song" (aka "Chestnuts Roasting on an Open Fire") – and movies. He has been presented as a villain in some media and a hero in others.

In popular culture

Literature
 Hannah Flagg Gould's (1789-1865) poem "The Frost" features a mischievous being responsible for the quieter phenomena of winter, beautiful ice paintings on windows but who also got upset at lack of gifts and caused the cold to break and ruin things.
 In Margaret T. Canby's "Birdie and His Fairy Friends" (1874), there is a short story titled "The Frost Fairies." In this story, Jack Frost is the king of the Winter Spirits and is described as a kind fellow who wants to help children, whereas a king of a neighboring kingdom, King Winter, is cruel to them. The story tells the origins of how Jack Frost began to oversee the coloring of the leaves of the forest in fall.
 In 1891 Helen Keller made her own reproduction of the story, titled The Frost King.
 In Charles Sangster's "Little Jack Frost", published in The Aldine, (Vol.7, No.16, 1875) Jack Frost is a playful being who runs around playing pranks and 'nose-biting', coating places with snow before being chased off by Dame Nature for spring.
 In L. Frank Baum's The Life and Adventures of Santa Claus (1902), Jack Frost is the son of the otherwise unnamed Frost King. He takes pleasure in nipping "scores of noses and ears and toes", but Santa Claus, who likes Jack (who he sees as a "jolly rogue") though he mistrusts him, asks him to spare the children. Jack says he will, if he can resist the temptation. The same Jack appears in "The Runaway Shadows", a short story by Baum. In this story, he has the power to freeze shadows, separating them from their owners, making them their own living entities.
 In Laurell K. Hamilton's Meredith Gentry series, a character emerges as the original Jack Frost. 
 Jack Frost has appeared as a minor character in the Rupert Bear stories.
 In the Rainbow Magic books by Daisy Meadows, Jack Frost is an antagonist who causes trouble in  Fairyland. He is accompanied by pesky goblins who steal the fairies' important objects, and try to sabotage them.
 Jack Frost also appears in "First Death in Nova Scotia", a poem by Elizabeth Bishop.
 In the novel Hogfather by Terry Pratchett, Jack grows tired of "fern patterns" and paints more elaborate pictures on windows.
 Jack Frost appears in The Veil trilogy of novels by Christopher Golden.
 The Man Jack, an enigmatic assassin, calls himself Jack Frost in The Graveyard Book by Neil Gaiman.
 The Stranger, a picture book by Chris Van Allsburg, stars Jack Frost as a lonely stranger with amnesia.
In Amy Wilson's The Lost Frost Girl, Jack Frost’s daughter Owl discovers powers she’s inherited from Jack and ventures into the world of the fae.

Comics
 In comic books, Jack Frost appears as a superhero in works published by Timely Comics ( Marvel Comics) in the 1940s.
 Marvel Comics had a second Jack Frost, the first alias of the original Blizzard.
 Jack Frost is the alias of Dane McGowan one of the main characters from the 1990s Vertigo series The Invisibles.
 In Jack of Fables (a Fables spinoff) the titular character became Jack Frost for a period of time. A second Jack Frost ("Jack too, or Jack two") appears as the son of Jack Horner and The Snow Queen.

Films
 Jack Frost, a Russian film from 1964, has the title Morozko—the Russian equivalent of Jack Frost.
 In the 1997 film Jack Frost, Scott MacDonald plays a serial killer turned into a snowman who continues his rampage. This movie spawned a sequel in 2000: Jack Frost 2: Revenge of the Mutant Killer Snowman.
 In the 1998 film Jack Frost, Michael Keaton plays a human turned into a snowman by the name of Jack Frost.
 Jack Frost appears as the primary antagonist in The Santa Clause 3: The Escape Clause played by Martin Short. 
 Jack Frost appears as the main protagonist of Rise of the Guardians, loosely based on the series Guardians of Childhood by William Joyce, voiced by Chris Pine.

Radio, animation, and television
 Jack Frost appears in the children's radio serial The Cinnamon Bear.
 Jack Frost appears as the title character in Ub Iwerks's 1934 animated short Jack Frost in the ComiColor Cartoons series.
Jack Frost is the title character (voiced by Robert Morse) of a Rankin/Bass TV special produced in 1979. The character (voiced by Paul Frees) also makes an appearance in the Christmas television special Frosty's Winter Wonderland and in Rudolph and Frosty's Christmas in July, voiced again by Paul Frees.

Video games
Jack Frost has appeared in many video games including:

 Megami Tensei (game series including spin-offs such as Shin Megami Tensei, Jack Bros., and Persona; this iteration of Jack Frost is also the mascot for the games' developer, Atlus)
 AdventureQuest
 City of Villains
 Granado Espada
 Guild Wars
 Killing Floor
 Ragnarok Online
 Rise of the Guardians: The Video Game (which is based on the film of the same name)
 RuneScape
 Scribblenauts Unlimited
 The Sims FreePlay

Music
 Jethro Tull has a song titled "Jack Frost and the Hooded Crow"
 Saint Vitus depict Jack Frost as an evil spirit of winter on their album V
 The radio station WRHS-FM 89.7 in Norridge, Illinois brands its holiday music format "Jack Frost"
 The name has been employed as a pseudonym by musicians Bob Dylan and Jack Dempsey
 Jack Frost, an Austrian doom metal band
 Jack Frost, an Australian duo
 Jack Frost, a 1991 album by Jack Frost 
 The song "The Christmas Song" by Nat King Cole has the lyric "Jack Frost nipping at your nose"
 The Burt Bacharach song "The Bell That Couldn't Jingle" features Jack Frost "freezing a teardrop"

See also 

 Frau Holle
 Father Frost (fairy tale)
 Heikki Lunta
 Snow Miser
 Yuki-onna
 General Winter, also known as General Frost
 Ded Moroz

References

External links

Jack Frost (1979) at IMDb

 
Christmas characters
English folklore
English legendary creatures
Fictional characters with ice or cold abilities
Fictional humanoids
Fictional snowmen
Holiday characters
Jack tales
Personifications of weather
Winter in culture
Winter traditions
Sprites (folklore)